Salvatore Sciarrino (born 4 April 1947) is an Italian composer of contemporary classical music. Described as "the best-known and most performed Italian composer" of the present day, his works include Quaderno di strada (2003) and La porta della legge (2006–08).

Biography
A native of Palermo, the young Sciarrino was attracted to the visual arts, but began experimenting with music when he was twelve. Though he had some lessons from Antonino Titone and Turi Belfiore, he is primarily self-taught as a composer. After his classical studies and a few years of university in his home city, in 1969 he moved to Rome, where he attended Franco Evangelisti's course in electronic music at the Accademia di Santa Cecilia.

In 1977, Sciarrino moved from Rome to Milan, where he taught at the conservatory until 1982. By this time his compositional career had expanded to the point where he could withdraw from teaching, and he moved to Città di Castello, in Umbria, where he has lived ever since. He nevertheless has continued to teach occasionally in Florence and Bologna, as well as in Città di Castello. Some of his notable students include Francesco Filidei, Lucia Ronchetti, David Monacchi, and Maurizio Pisati. 

He has composed for: Teatro alla Scala, RAI, Teatro del Maggio Musicale Fiorentino, Biennale di Venezia, Teatro La Fenice di Venezia, Teatro Carlo Felice di Genova, Fondazione Arena di Verona, Stuttgart State Opera, Brussels La Monnaie, Frankfurt Opera Theatre, Amsterdam Concertgebouw, London Symphony Orchestra, Tokyo Suntory Hall. He has also composed for the following festivals: Schwetzinger Festspiele, Donaueschinger Musiktage, Witten, Salzburg, New York, Wien Modern, Wiener Festwochen, Berliner Festspiele Musik, Holland Festival, Alborough, Festival d'Automne (Paris), Ultima (Oslo).

His music was published by Ricordi from 1969 to 2004. Since 2005, Rai Trade has had exclusive rights for Sciarrino’s works.

Sciarrino’s discography is extensive: there are over 70 CDs, many of which have won awards.

Apart from being author of most of the librettos of his operas, Sciarrino has written many articles, essays and texts, some of which have been chosen and collected in Carte da suono, CIDIM – Novecento, 2001. His book about musical form: Le figure della musica da Beethoven a oggi (Ricordi 1998) is particularly important.

From 1978 to 1980, he was Artistic Director of Teatro Comunale di Bologna, Academic of Santa Cecilia (Roma), Academic of Fine Arts of Bavaria and Academic of the Arts (Berlin).

He has been teaching at the Accademia Musicale Chigiana since 2013; beforehand he held the composition class in 1983 and in 2002.

Sciarrino has won many awards, among the most recent are: Prince Pierre de Monaco (2003) and the prestigious Feltrinelli Prize (2003). He is also the first prizewinner of the newly created Salzburg Music Prize (2006), an International composition prize established by Salzburg. He received the 2011 BBVA Foundation Frontiers of Knowledge Award of Contemporary Music for renewing the possibilities of vocal and instrumental music and for the singularity of his sound materials. Sciarrino has developed a new and unique syntax and a manner of combining extreme synthesis with richness of detail.

Musical style
Pietro Misuraca, in one of the most recent books on the composer's music (2018), wrote:

Works
Sciarrino's works include a large body of chamber music, including many pieces for wind instruments, five piano sonatas, and several operas or theatrical works: Da gelo a gelo, Infinito nero, Macbeth (2002), Perseo ed Andromeda, Lohengrin, and Luci mie traditrici.

He published with Casa Ricordi from 1969 to 2004; from the following year, the exclusive rights to Sciarrino's works passed to Rai Trade. His discography is very wide-ranging, including more than eighty titles, published by international labels and repeatedly mentioned and rewarded.

References

Sources

Further reading

 Bartolini, Donatella. 1999. "La genialità? Il segreto è nell'universo infantile: Intervista a Salvatore Sciarrino".  33, no. 2 (April–June): 227–232.
 Boni, Monica, and Luigi Pestalozza. 1997. "La musica in Italia dal 1945 ad oggi: Un archivio vivente" Musica/Realtà 18, no. 54 (November): 173–184.
 Borio, Gianmario. 1991. "Der italienische Komponist Salvatore Sciarrino". Neue Zeitschrift für Musik 152, no. 5 (May): 33–36.
 Carapezza, Paolo Emilio. 1989. "De musices novissimae extremis elementis (Sciarrino, Donatoni)". In Polsko-włoskie materiały muzyczne, edited by Michał Bristiger, Jarosław Iwaszkiewicz, Paolo Emilio Carapezza, and Renato Guttoso, 302–309. Kraków: Polskie Wydawnictwo Muzyczne.
 . 2002. "Musikalische Figurenlehre: Salvatore Sciarrino als Analytiker und Komponist".  6, no. 22 (April): 106–111.
 Geraci, Toni. n.d. "La sonatina per violino e pianoforte di Salvatore Sciarrino"." In L'analisi musicale: Atti del convegno di Reggio Emilia, 16–19 marzo 1989, edited by Rossana Dalmonte and Mario Baroni. Milan: Unicopli.
 Giomi, Francesco, and Marco Ligabue. 1998. "The 'Enchanted' Sound Objects: Aesthetic-Cognitive Analysis and Musical Signification Strategies". In Les universaux en musique: Actes du quatrième congrès international sur la signification musicale, edited by Costin Mireanu and Xavier Hascher, with a foreword by Michel Guiomar. Paris: Publications de la Sorbonne.
 Helgeson, Aaron. 2013. "What Is Phenomenological Music, and What Does It Have to Do with Salvatore Sciarrino?" Perspectives of New Music 51, no. 2 (Summer): 4–36.
 Kager, Reinhard. 1998. "Salvatore Sciarrinos Oper Die tödliche Blume: UA 19.5. in Schwetzingen; 29.–31.5. in Wien". Österreichische Musikzeitschrift 53, no. 5 (May): 50–51.
 Lanza Tomasi, Gioacchino. 1969. "I due volti dell'alea". Nuova rivista musicale italiana. 3, no. 6 (November–December): 1076–1095.
 Leydon, Rebecca. 2013. "Narrativity, Descriptivity, and Secondary Parameters: Ecstasy Enacted in Salvatore Sciarrino's Infinito nero". In Music and Narrative since 1900, edited by Michael L. Klein and Nicholas Reyland. Bloomington: Indiana University Press.
 Ligabue, Marco, and Francesco Giomi. 1996. "Gli oggetti sonori incantati di Salvatore Sciarrino: Analisi estesico-cognitiva di Come vengono prodotti gli incantesimi?" Nuova rivista musicale italiana 30, nos. 1–2 (January–June):155–179.
 Mazzolino, Marco. 1990. "Incontro con Salvatore Sciarrino di Marco Mazzolini: Dell'interrogare" Sonus: Materiali per la musica contemporanea 2, nos. 3 & 4 (June–August): 45–56.
 Misuraca, Pietro. 2018. "Il suono, il silenzio, l'ascolto". Rome: NeoClassica
 Müller, Patrick, and Grazia Graccho. 2000. "Zwischen Raum und Zeit: Zu den 'Figuren' von Salvatore Sciarrino". Dissonanz, no. 65:20–25.
 Pais, João Miguel. 2007. "Salvatore Sciarrinos Variazione su uno spazio ricurvo", translated by Hermann J. Metzler. Musik & Ästhetik 11, no. 41 (January): 62–79.
 Petazzi, Paolo. 1997. "'...isola, mare, prigionia, spazio...': Il Perseo e Andromeda di Salvatore Sciarrino". In Paolo Petazzi, Percorsi viennesi e altro Novecento, 241–252. Potenza: Sonus Edizioni Musicali. .
 Pinzauti, Leonardo. 1977. "A colloquio con Salvatore Sciarrino" Nuova rivista musicale italiana 11, no. 1 (January–March): 50–57.
 Saxer, Marion. 2006. "Scheiternde Verständigung: Melancholie im Musiktheater Salvatore Sciarrinos" Neue Zeitschrift für Musik 167, no. 6 (November–December): 26–29.
 Sciarrino, Salvatore. 1998. Le figure della musica: da Beethoven a oggi. Milan: Ricordi. .
 Sciarrino, Salvatore. 2000. Après "Giovanna d'Arco": Deux réflexions. In Arrangements, dérangements: La transcription musicale aujourd'hui, edited by Peter Szendy, 97–99. Paris: L'Harmattan.
 Stuppner, Herbert. 1993. "Salvatore Sciarrinos archaisierende Sphärenklänge". In Brennpunkt Nono: Programmbuch Zeitfluß 93, edited by Josef Häusler. Zürich, Switzerland: Palladion.
 Vidolin, Alvise. 1996. "I suoni di sintesi nel "Perseo e Andromeda" di Salvatore Sciarrino". In Nell'aria della sera: Il Mediterraneo e la musica, edited by Carlo de Incontrera, 353–387. Monfalcone: Teatro Comunale di Monfalcone.
 Vinay, Gianfranco, Philippe Gontier, and Marylène Raiola. 2000. "La construction de l'arche invisible: Salvatore Sciarrino à propos de dramaturgie et de son théâtre musical". Dissonance, no. 65 (August):14–19.
 Zavagna, P., A. Provaglio, Salvatore Sciarrino, and Alvise Vidolin. 1991. "Perseo e Andromeda, opera lirica in un atto per mezzosoprano, tenore, baritono, basso e sistemi informatici di Salvatore Sciarrino: Composizione, realizzazione ed esecuzione". In IX Colloquium on Musical Informatics/IX Colloquio di Informatica Musicale, edited by Corrado Canepa and Antonio Camurri. Genoa: Associazione di Informatica Musicale Italiana.

External links

Salvatore Sciarrino, Accademia Musicale Chigiana

1947 births
Living people
20th-century classical composers
21st-century classical composers
Italian classical composers
Italian male classical composers
Composers from Sicily
Avant-garde composers
Italian opera composers
Male opera composers
Musicians from Palermo
Accademia Nazionale di Santa Cecilia alumni
Academic staff of Milan Conservatory
Members of the Academy of Arts, Berlin
20th-century Italian composers
21st-century Italian composers
20th-century Italian male musicians
21st-century Italian male musicians